Jaycee Gebhard (born June 2, 1999) is a Canadian ice hockey centre, currently playing with Brynäs IF Dam of the Swedish Women's Hockey League (SDHL). Selected in the first round, 6th overall in the 2020 NWHL Draft, she was the first ever draft pick of the Toronto Six of the National Women's Hockey League (NWHL).

Playing career  
Across 139 NCAA games, Gebhard scored 198 points, setting the all-time career point record for the Robert Morris Colonials women's ice hockey program. She was named College Hockey America (CHA) Rookie of the Year and Women's Hockey Commissioners Association National Rookie of the Year in her first season. She was a Patty Kazmaier Memorial Award nominee in 2020, and was a finalist for the CHA Player of the Year award.

In April 2020, Gebhard was selected in the first round, 6th overall in the 2020 NWHL Draft by the Toronto Six expansion team, being the first player to be drafted in the team's history. The following month, she would sign her first professional contract with Brynäs IF in Sweden.

International  

Gebhard was an assistant captain for Team Canada at the 2015 IIHF World Women's U18 Championship, putting up four points in five games and winning a silver medal.

References

External links 

1997 births
Living people
Canadian women's ice hockey centres
Ice hockey people from Saskatchewan
Brynäs IF Dam players
Robert Morris Colonials women's ice hockey players